The 2010–11 season was Galatasarays 107th in existence and the 53rd consecutive season in the Süper Lig. This article shows statistics of the club's players in the season, and also lists all matches that the club have played in the season.

Players

Squad information

Players in / out

In

Total spending:  €28 million

Out

Total income:   €18.15 million.

Player statistics

Squad stats

Disciplinary record

Club

Board of directors

Technical staff

Medical staff

Pre-season and friendlies
Kickoff times are in CET.

Competitions

Overall

Süper Lig

Standings

Results summary

Results by round

Matches
Kickoff times are in EET.

Turkish Cup

Group stage

Quarter-finals

UEFA Europa League

Third qualifying round

Play-off round

Attendance

 Sold season tickets: 20,000

References

External links
Galatasaray Sports Club Official Website 
Turkish Football Federation - Galatasaray A.Ş. 
uefa.com - Galatasaray AŞ

2010-11
Turkish football clubs 2010–11 season
2010 in Istanbul
2011 in Istanbul
Galatasaray Sports Club 2010–11 season